Nattawut Sombatyotha is a Thai professional footballer who plays as an attacking midfielder for Thai League 1 club Port. He was born in Kalasin Province, in the northeast of Thailand, before relocating to Chonburi.

Early life and career

As a child, Nattawut had a strong aversion to football until his older brother asked him to play football in order to lose weight. Gradually, he began to enjoy playing football as a sport and soon had the desire to improve. After outclassing his age group, Nattawut joined the JMG Academy and later attended the Bangkok Christian College, where he was called up to the Thailand Under-16's.

Senior career

After winning the 2011 AFF U-16 Youth Championship with the Thailand Under-16's, he was handed a trial by Buriram United, who scouted him at the tournament. They signed him, and he was invited along with seven other Thai players to train for six months at Premier League club Leicester City's Academy. The experience affected him positively, since he claimed that it had "enriched him greatly". Afterwards, the forward was loaned to Thai third division side Surin City where he scored 5 goals in 14 outings.

International career

He won the 2011 AFF U-16 Youth Championship with Thailand U16. In 2016 Nattawut was selected in Thailand U23 squad for 2016 AFC U-23 Championship in Qatar.
In August 2017, he won the Football at the 2017 Southeast Asian Games with Thailand U23.

International goals

U23

U21

U16

Honours

Club
Buriram United
 Thai League T1: 2014
 Thai FA Cup: 2014
 Thai League Cup: 2014

International
Thailand U-23
 Sea Games Gold Medal: 2017
 Dubai Cup: 2017
Thailand U-21
 Nations Cup: 2016
Thailand U-16
 AFF U-16 Youth Championship: 2011

References

External links
 Profile at Goal

Living people
1996 births
Nattawut Sombatyotha
Nattawut Sombatyotha
Association football forwards
Nattawut Sombatyotha
Nattawut Sombatyotha
Nattawut Sombatyotha
Nattawut Sombatyotha
Nattawut Sombatyotha
Nattawut Sombatyotha
Nattawut Sombatyotha
Southeast Asian Games medalists in football
Competitors at the 2017 Southeast Asian Games